A salute is usually a formal hand gesture or other action used to display respect in military situations. Salutes are primarily associated with the military and law enforcement, but many civilian organizations, such as Girl Guides, Boy Scouts and the Salvation Army use formal salutes. Ordinary civilians also salute informally to greet or acknowledge the presence of another person; such as a tip of the hat or a hand wave to a friend or neighbour.

Military salutes

Throughout history, military organizations have used many methods to perform salutes. Depending on the situation a salute could be a hand or body gesture, cannon or rifle shots, hoisting of flags, removing headgear, or other means of showing respect or deference.

Hand salutes

Origins 

According to historical reconstruction, the ancient Roman military salute (salutatio militaris) was analogous to the current military salute. According to some modern military manuals, the modern Western salute originated in France when knights greeted each other to show friendly intentions by raising their visors to show their faces. Others also note that the raising of one's visor was a way to identify oneself saying "This is who I am, and I am not afraid." Medieval visors were, to this end, equipped with a protruding spike that allowed the visor to be raised using a saluting motion.
Also to show a sign of peace, that they are not carrying a weapon [in their right hand].

The US Army Quartermaster School provides another explanation of the origin of the hand salute: that it was a long-established military courtesy for subordinates to remove their headgear in the presence of superiors. As late as the American Revolution, a British Army soldier saluted by removing his hat. With the advent of increasingly cumbersome headgear in the 18th and 19th centuries, the act of removing one's hat was gradually converted into the simpler gesture of grasping or touching the visor and issuing a courteous salutation.

As early as 1745, a British order book stated that: "The men are ordered not to pull off their hats when they pass an officer, or to speak to them, but only to clap up their hands to their hats and bow as they pass." Over time, it became conventionalized into something resembling the modern hand salute. In the Austrian Army the practice of making a hand salute replaced that of removing the headdress in 1790, although officers wearing cocked hats continued to remove them when greeting superiors until 1868.

The naval salute, with the palm downwards is said to have evolved because the palms of naval ratings, particularly deckhands, were often dirty through working with lines and was deemed insulting to present a dirty palm to an officer; thus the palm was turned downwards. During the Napoleonic Wars, British crews saluted officers by touching a clenched fist to the brow as though grasping a hat-brim between fingers and thumb.

Hand salutes are normally carried out by bringing the right hand to the head in some way, the precise manner varying between countries and sometimes amongst various branches of the armed forces of the same country. The British Army's salute is almost identical to the French salute, with the palm facing outward. The customary salute in the Polish Armed Forces is the two-fingers salute, a variation of the British military salute with only two fingers extended. In the Russian military, the right hand, palm down, is brought to the right temple, almost, but not quite, touching; the head has to be covered. In the Hellenic Army salute, the palm is facing down and the fingers point to the coat of arms.

In many militaries, hand salutes are only given when a cover (protection for the head, usually a hat) is worn.

Small arms salutes 

When carrying a sword, still done on ceremonial occasions, European military forces and their cultural descendants use a two-step gesture. The sword is first raised, in the right hand, to the level of and close to the front of the neck. The blade is inclined forward and up 30 degrees from the vertical; the true edge is to the left. Then the sword is slashed downward to a position with the point close to the ground in front of the right foot. The blade is inclined down and forward with the true edge to the left. This gesture originated in the Crusades. The hilt of a sword formed a cross with the blade, so if a crucifix was not available, a Crusader could kiss the hilt of his sword when praying, before entering battle, for oaths and vows, and so on. The lowering of the point to the ground is a traditional act of submission.

In fencing, the fencers salute each other before putting their masks on to begin a bout. There are several methods of doing this, but the most common is to bring the sword in front of the face so that the blade is pointing up in front of the nose. The fencers also salute the referee and the audience.

When armed with a rifle, two methods are available when saluting. The usual method is called "present arms"; the rifle is brought to the vertical, muzzle up, in front of the center of the chest with the trigger away from the body. The hands hold the stock close to the positions they would have if the rifle were being fired, though the trigger is not touched. Less formal salutes include the "order arms salute" and the "shoulder arms salutes." These are most often given by a sentry to a low-ranking superior who does not rate the full "present arms" salute. In the "order arms salute," the rifle rests on its butt by the sentry's right foot, held near the muzzle by the sentry's right hand, and does not move. The sentry brings his flattened left hand across his body and touches the rifle near its muzzle. When the rifle is being carried on the shoulder, a similar gesture is used in which the flattened free hand is brought across the body to touch the rifle near the rear of the receiver.

A different type of salute with a rifle is a ritual firing performed during military funerals, known as a three-volley salute. In this ceremonial act, an odd number of riflemen fire three blank cartridges in unison into the air over the casket. This originates from an old European tradition wherein a battle was halted to remove the dead and wounded, then three shots were fired to signal readiness to re-engage.

Heavy arms: gun salutes

By country

Australia and New Zealand 
In the Commonwealth of Nations, only commissioned officers are saluted, and the salute is to the commission they carry from their respective commanders-in-chief representing the monarch, not the officers themselves. 

In both countries, the right-hand salute is generally identical to, and drawn from the traditions of, the British armed forces. The salute of the Australian or New Zealand Army is best described as the right arm taking the path of the longest way up and then the shortest way down. Similar in many ways, the salute of the Royal Australian Air Force and Royal New Zealand Air Force takes the longest way up and the shortest way down. The Royal Australian Navy and Royal New Zealand Navy, however, take the shortest way up, palm down, and the shortest way down. The action of the arm rotating up is slower than the action of the conclusion of the salute which is the arm being quickly "snapped" down to the saluter's side. Junior members are required to salute first and the senior member is obliged to return the compliment. Protocol dictates that the monarch, members of the royal family, the governor-general, and state governors are to be saluted at all times by all ranks. Except where a drill manual (or parade) protocol dictates otherwise, the duration of the salute is timed at three beats of the quick-time march (approximately 1.5 seconds), timed from the moment the senior member first returns it. In situations where cover (or "headdress", as it is called in the Australian Army) is not being worn, the salute is given verbally; the junior party (or at least the senior member thereof) will first come to attention, then offer the salute "Good morning/afternoon Your Majesty/Your Royal Highness/Prime Minister/Your Grace/Sir/Ma'am", etc., as the case may be. It is this, rather than the act of standing to attention, which indicates that a salute is being offered. If either party consists of two or more members, all will come to attention, but only the most senior member of the party will offer (or return) the physical or verbal salute. The party wearing headdress must always offer, or respond with, a full salute. But within the Forward Edge of the Battle Area (FEBA) no salutes of any kind are given, under any circumstances; it is always sensible to assume that there are snipers in the area who may see or overhear. In this case, parties personally known to each other are addressed familiarly by their first or given names, regardless of rank; senior officers are addressed as one might address a stranger, courteously, but without any naming or mark of respect.

Canada

Much as the British salute described above (except the palm is level with the ground, without the U.S.A. slight over-rotation of the wrist), the Canadian military salutes to demonstrate a mark of respect and courtesy for the commissioned ranks. When in uniform and not wearing headdress one does not salute. Instead, compliments shall be paid by standing at attention. If on the march, arms shall be swung and the head turned to the left or right as required.

On Remembrance Day, 2009, The Prince of Wales attended the national ceremony in Ottawa with Governor General Michaëlle Jean—both wearing Canadian military dress. CBC live television coverage of the event noted that, when Prince Charles saluted, he performed the Canadian form of the salute with a cupped hand (the British "naval salute"—appropriate, as he did his military service as an officer in the Royal Navy), adopted by all elements of the Canadian Forces after unification in 1968, rather than the British (Army) form with the palm facing forward.

Denmark

In the Danish military, there are two types of military salutes. The first type is employed by the Royal Danish Navy and Guard Hussar Regiment Mounted Squadron, and is the same as the one used by the U.S. The second is employed by the Royal Danish Army and Royal Danish Air Force, and goes as follows: Raise the right arm forward, as to have upper arm 90 degrees from the body. Move the right hand to the temple, and have it parallel to the ground.

France

Subordinates salute superiors and every salute is given back. Hand salutes are not performed if a member is not wearing a headdress or if he is holding a weapon. 

The French salute,  is performed with a flat hand, palm facing forwards; the upper arm is horizontal and the tips of the fingers come near the corner of the eyes. The hand, unlike the British salute, remains at a 45-degree angle in line with the lower arm. The five fingers are lined together. It mirrors the gesture made by knights greeting each other, raising their visors to show their faces. A crisp tension may be given when the salute is taken or broken. 

Some "creative" salutes are in use in certain mounted (cavalry) units. The fingers can be spread out with only the right thumb brushing the temple, or the hand can be cocked vertically along the cheek, with the little finger detached or not. These unusual regimental salutes are Mannerisms which are lost during official ceremonies. A civilian (even if he has a hat) never salutes, but a nod to a patrolling soldier is generally appreciated.

Germany
In the German Bundeswehr, the salute is performed with a flat hand, with the thumb resting on the index finger. The hand is slightly tilted to the front so that the thumb can not be seen. The upper arm is horizontal and the fingers point to the temple but do not touch it or the headgear. Every soldier saluting another uniformed soldier is entitled to be saluted in return. Soldiers below the rank of Feldwebel are not permitted to speak while saluting. Since the creation of the Bundeswehr, soldiers are required to salute with and without headgear. Originally, in the Reichswehr it was not permitted to perform the salute when the soldier is not wearing uniform headgear. In the Wehrmacht, the traditional military salute was required when wearing headgear, but the Nazi salute was performed when not wearing headgear. The Wehrmacht eventually fully adopted the Nazi salute following the 20 July Plot. East German National People's Army followed the Reichswehr protocol.

India

In India, the three forces have different salutes with the Indian Army and the Indian Navy following the British tradition. In the Indian army, the salute is performed by keeping the open palm forward, with fingers and thumb together and middle finger almost touching the hatband or right eyebrow. This is often accompanied by the salutation "Jai Hind" which means long live India or Victory to India, or the regimental salutation, e.g. "Sat Sri Akal" in the Sikh Regiment. The Navy salute has the palm facing towards the ground at a 90-degree angle. The Indian Air Force salute involves the right arm being sharply raised from the front by the shortest possible way, with the plane of the palm at 45-degree angle to the forehead.

Indonesia

In Indonesia, executing a salute has its regulations. Members who are part of a uniformed institution and wearing a uniform will implement a gesture of salute according to the regulations of the institution the member is part of. In this case, personnel of the TNI and Indonesian National Police are to implement a hand salute by forming the right hand up making an angle of 90 degrees and is bent 45 degrees, fingers are pressed together and placed near the temple of the right eye, palm facing down. Personnel wearing a headdress place the tip of the right index finger touching the front right tip of the headdress. Other uniformed organizations/institutions which are not part of the military/police will implement a hand salute as done by members of the military/police.

The command for this gesture in Indonesian is Hormat, Gerak!. Military and police personnel armed with a rifle during a ceremony will implement a present arms while personnel unarmed will execute the hand salute.

This is done during the raising and/or lowering of the national flag, rendition or singing of the national anthem, and when saluting a person or object worth saluting.

Israel

In the Israel Defense Forces, saluting is normally reserved for special ceremonies. Unlike in the US Army, saluting is not a constant part of day to day barracks life.

Italy
The hand salute is still performed according to the army "Infantry Training – Formal Instructions" regulation, chapter II, section 12 (1939) "The salute is completed sharply ... bringing the right hand vigorously to the visor of the headdress, with the tip of the fingers over the right eye; the hand in line with the forearm, with the palm facing downwards, the fingers joined and stretched, the index finger in contact with the edge of the visor; horizontal arm, forearm naturally inclined". The air force and navy use the same procedure, with the single exception of the navy boatswains that salute left-handed while giving the traditional "pipe aboard", as their right hand is used to hold the boatswain's call.

When given individually, the salute is given by inferior to superior ranks and is held until returned, and by word of command when given by a formed unit. For personnel not wearing hats, holding weapons or with otherwise encumbered hands, the salute is given by coming to attention. During marching armed parades only the officer in command salutes for the whole unit, briefly bringing the flat of his sword to his face if in full dress, or giving the standard hand salute if in combat uniform. During flag-rising and flag-lowering armed parades all officers and senior NCOs hand salute the flag, while other ranks present arms, and the whole unit sings the national anthem. Flag parties give salute by slightly inclining the flag only, with the flag-bearer and the escort not giving individual salutes.

Japan

In Japan, the angle of salute depends on the branch. In the Ground and the Air Self-Defense Forces, the salute is 90 degrees under the armpit like the U.S. Armed Forces. In the Maritime Self-Defense Forces, the salute is a 45-degree angle because of the narrowness of a ship's interior spaces. To prevent a member's elbow from hitting other members, subordinates may be given approval to not salute in a corridor inside the ship. Furthermore, in all the branches, if a member is not wearing their cap, then they should salute by bowing 10 degrees.

Pakistan
In Pakistan, the salute is generally identical to that of British armed forces. In the Army and Air Force, the salute is given with the right hand palm facing forward and fingers slightly touching the right side of the forehead, but not on the forehead. The Navy continues to salute palm down. The salute must be performed by the lower rank officials to the higher rank officials under all conditions except when the higher rank official is not in uniform or if the lower rank official is the driver and the vehicle is in motion. The salute is never performed by the left hand even if the right hand is occupied.

People's Republic of China
Military personnel of the People's Liberation Army salute palm-down, similar to the Royal Navy or US Military salutes.

Poland

Polish military personnel use two fingers to salute, with the middle and index fingers extended and touching each other, while the ring and little fingers are bent and touched by the thumb.

Sweden
Salutes are similar to those of the Royal Navy. The official instruction for stationary salute states: "The right hand is quickly raised straight up to the headgear. The fingers straight but not stiff next to each other, the little finger edge facing forward. One or two finger tips lightly resting against the right part of the headgear (visor), so that the hand does not obstruct the eye. The wrist straight, the elbow angled forward and slightly lower than the shoulder." Salutes to persons are normally not made when further away than 30 m. Hand salutes are performed only when carrying headgear, if bare headed (normally only indoors) a swift turning of the head towards the person that is being saluted is made instead. The same applies if the right hand is carrying any item that cannot easily be transferred to the left hand. During inspections and when on guard duty, the salute is made by coming to attention. Drivers of moving vehicles never salute. In formations, only the commander salutes.

Switzerland
Swiss soldiers are required to salute any higher-ranking military personnel whenever they encounter them. When the soldier announces to a higher-ranking person he has to state the superior's rank, his rank and his name. When a military formation encounters a superior, it has to state the name of the formation. The salute is given with the palm pointing towards the shoulder, the tips of the fingers pointing towards the temple.

Turkey

Within the Turkish military hand salutes are only given when a cover (protection for the head, usually a hat) is worn.

If the head is not covered or when the personnel is carrying a rifle on the shoulder the head salute is performed by nodding the head forward slightly while maintaining erect posture.

The salute (hand or head) must be performed first by the lower ranking personnel to the higher ranking personnel, and higher official is expected to return the salute, under all conditions except:
 Personnel who are driving vehicles.
 Personnel who are on sentry, patrol, observation duty or defending a specific point.
 Personnel on combat orders.
 Personnel who are transporting live ammunition.
 Military prisoners and personnel escorting them.

The casket of a soldier killed in the line of duty (irrespective of rank) has to be saluted by all ranks of personnel.

United Kingdom

British Army 

Since 1917, the British Army's salute has been given with the right hand palm facing forwards with the fingers almost touching the cap or beret. Before 1917, for Other Ranks (i.e. not officers) the salute was given with whichever hand was furthest from the person being saluted, whether that was the right or the left. Officers always saluted with the right hand (as the left, in theory, would always be required to hold the scabbard of their sword). The salute is given to acknowledge the King's commission. A salute may not be given unless a soldier is wearing his regimental headdress, for example a beret, caubeen, Tam o' Shanter, Glengarry, field service cap or peaked cap. This does not apply to members of The Blues and Royals (RHG/1stD) The Household Cavalry who, after The Battle of Warburg were allowed to salute without headdress. If a soldier or officer is not wearing headdress then he or she must come to attention instead of giving/returning the salute. The subordinate salutes first and maintains the salute until the superior has responded in kind.

There is a widespread though erroneous belief that it is statutory for "all ranks to salute a bearer of the Victoria Cross". There is no official requirement that appears in the official Warrant of the VC, nor in King's Regulations and Orders, but tradition dictates that this occurs and as such the Chiefs of Staff will salute a Private awarded either a VC or George Cross.

Royal Air Force 
The custom of saluting commissioned officers relates wholly to the commission given by His Majesty the King to that officer, not the person. Therefore, when a subordinate airman salutes an officer, he is indirectly acknowledging His Majesty as Head of State. A salute returned by the officer is on behalf of the King.

The RAF salute is similar to the British Army, the hand is brought upwards in a circular motion out from the body, it is stopped 1 inch (25 mm) to the rear and to the right of the right eye, the elbow and wrist are kept in line with the shoulder. The hand is then brought straight down back to the position of attention, this movement is completed to the timing "UP TWO-THREE DOWN".

Royal Navy 
The Naval salute differs in that the palm of the hand faces down towards the shoulder. This dates back to the days of sailing ships, when tar and pitch were used to seal a ship's timbers from seawater. To protect their hands, officers wore white gloves and it was considered most undignified to present a dirty palm in the salute, so the hand was turned through 90 degrees. A common story is that Queen Victoria, having been saluted by an individual with a dirty palm, decreed that in future sailors of the fleet would salute palm down, with the palm facing the ground.

Royal Marines 
The Royal Marines follow the British Army and salute with the right hand palm facing forward.

British Empire 
In the British Empire (originally in the maritime and hinterland sphere of influence of the East India Company, HEIC, later transformed into crown territories), mainly in British India, the numbers of guns fired as a gun salute to the ruler of a so-called princely state became a politically highly significant indicator of his status, not governed by objective rules, but awarded (and in various cases increased) by the British paramount power, roughly reflecting his state's socio-economic, political and/or military weight, but also as a prestigious reward for loyalty to the Raj, in classes (always odd numbers) from three to twenty-one (seven lacking), for the "vassal" indigenous rulers (normally hereditary with a throne, sometimes raised as a personal distinction for an individual ruling prince). Two sovereign monarchies officially outside the Empire were granted a higher honour: thirty-one guns for the royal houses of Afghanistan (under British and Russian influence), and Siam (which was then ruled by the Rattanakosin Kingdom).

In addition, the right to style himself Highness (Majesty, which since its Roman origin expresses the sovereign authority of the state, was denied to all "vassals"), a title of great importance in international relations, was formally restricted to rulers of relatively high salute ranks (originally only those with eleven guns or more, later also those with nine guns).

United States

U.S. Armed Forces

Within the United States military, the salute is a courteous exchange of greetings. With the HDB individual salute, the head and eyes are turned toward the Colors or person saluted. Military personnel in uniform are required to salute when they meet and recognize persons entitled to a salute, except when it is inappropriate or impractical (in public conveyances such as planes and buses, in public places such as inside theaters, or when driving a vehicle).

Persons entitled to the salute include commissioned officers, warrant officers, the President of the United States, officers of friendly foreign nations, and recipients of the Medal of Honor (including enlisted personnel). Additionally, the flag of the United States is saluted during parades and other ceremonial functions.

The U.S. military's salute, while influenced by that of the British military, differs slightly in that the palm of the hand faces down towards the shoulder. This difference may date back to the days of sailing ships, when tar and pitch were used to seal the timber from seawater. During such times, it was considered undignified to present a dirty palm in the salute, so the hand was turned through 90 degrees.

Specifically, a proper salute goes as follows: Raise the right hand sharply, fingers and thumb extended and joined, palm facing down, and place the tip of the right forefinger on the rim of the visor, slightly to the right of the eye. The outer edge of the hand is barely canted downward so that neither the back of the hand nor the palm is clearly visible from the front. The hand and wrist are straight, the elbow inclined slightly forward, and the upper arm is horizontal.

Members of the United States Army, United States Air Force, and United States Space Force give salutes with heads both covered and uncovered, but saluting indoors is forbidden except when formally reporting to a superior officer or during an indoor ceremony. When outdoors, a head cover is to be worn at all times when wearing Army Combat Uniforms, but is not required when wearing physical training (PT) gear. The United States Navy, Marine Corps and Coast Guard do not salute when the head is uncovered or out of uniform.

US state defense forces

State defense forces (SDF) in the United States are military units that operate under the sole authority of a state government. State defense forces are authorized by state and federal law and are under the command of the governor of each state.

State defense forces soldiers are subject to the Uniform Code of Military Justice. They are also subject to their state military laws and regulations and render the same customs and courtesies as active duty, Reserve and National Guard personnel.

Zogist salute

The Zogist salute is a military salute that was instituted by Zog I of Albania. It is a gesture whereby the right hand is placed over the heart, with the palm facing downwards. It was first widely used by Zog's personal police force and was later adopted by the Royal Albanian Army.

In Mexico, a salute similar to the Zogist one is rendered by Mexican civilians during the playing of the Mexican national anthem.

Non-military services

Canada
Police services

The majority of police forces are taught to salute like the Canadian Armed Forces with a level palm and the middle finger aligned with the right eye, and not the brim of the hat. 

The federal Royal Canadian Mounted Police salute according to the British Army tradition with the palm facing forward.

Non-police

Similar salutes are used by guards of honour for non-police services (e.g. Toronto Fire Services, Toronto Transit Commission) during funerals or ceremonial events.

Hong Kong

All uniform branches of the Hong Kong Police, Police Auxiliary, Police Pipeband, Fire (including Ambulance service members), Immigration, Customs, Correctional Services, Government Flying Service, Civil Aid Service) salute according to British Army traditions until 2021. Personnel stationed with the People's Liberation Army in Hong Kong salute using the Chinese military standards and similar to those used by the Royal Navy.

Non-government organizations like Hong Kong Air Cadet Corps, Hong Kong Adventure Corps, the Boys' Brigade, Hong Kong, Hong Kong Sea Cadet Corps, Hong Kong Scout and St. John Ambulance all follow the same military salutes due to their ties with the British Armed Forces.

Civilian military auxiliaries (U.S.)

Civil Air Patrol

In the United States, civilian military auxiliaries such as the Civil Air Patrol are required to salute all commissioned and warrant officers of higher rank and return the salute of those with lower ranks of the U.S. Uniformed Services (Army, Navy, Air Force, Marine Corps, Coast Guard, U.S. Public Health Service, National Oceanic and Atmospheric Administration Commissioned Corps) senior in rank to them, as well as all friendly foreign officers, though military members are not required to reciprocate (they may salute voluntarily if they choose). CAP officers are required to salute one another though this is not uniformly observed throughout the CAP. Cadets are required to salute all CAP Senior Members and all commissioned and warrant officers of military/uniformed services.

U.S. Coast Guard Auxiliary
The U.S. Coast Guard Auxiliary requires its members to salute all commissioned and warrant officers of higher rank and return the salute of those with lower ranks; since Auxiliarists hold "office" rather than "grade" (indicated by modified military insignia), all Auxiliarists are required to perform this courtesy. Saluting between Auxiliarists is not usually the custom, but is not out of protocol to do so. When operating in direct support of the USCG, or when on military installations in general, Auxiliarists usually wear "member" insignia unless specified otherwise by the officer/NCO in charge.

Civilian salutes 
In most countries, civilians have their own form of salutes.

Albania
The same salute of the United States was instituted in Albania as the "Zog salute" by King Zog I.

Indonesia
In Indonesia, executing a salute is also regulated for civilians according to the Constitution of Indonesia. The salute gesture for civilians in civilian clothing is to stand upright in their respective positions with perfect posture, straightening their arms down, clenching palms, and thumbs facing forward against the thighs with a straight ahead gaze. Members of a uniformed organization/institution which are not part of the military/police such as fire fighters, traffic wardens, municipal policemen, immigration officers, customs officers, Search and Rescue personnel, scouts, school students, etc. in uniform will implement a hand salute as done by members of the military/police.

This is done during the raising and/or lowering of the national flag, rendition or singing of the national anthem, and when saluting a person or object worth saluting.

Iran
In Iran a salute similar to the United States is given. In ancient times a salute would be given by raising a flat hand in front of the chest with the thumb facing the saluters face.

Latin America
In Latin America, except in Mexico, a salute similar to the United States flag salute is used, with the hand over the heart.

Philippines
In the Philippines, civilians salute the national flag during flag raising and upon hearing the Philippine National Anthem by standing at attention and doing the same hand-to-heart salute as their American, Italian, Nigerian, and South African counterparts. People wearing hats or caps must bare their heads and hold the headwear over their heart; this rule however exempts those who wear headgear or headwear for religious purposes/reasons. Members of the Armed Forces of the Philippines, the Philippine National Police, Philippine Coast Guard, security guards, Boy Scouts of the Philippines, Girl Scouts of the Philippines, including citizens military training, and sometimes airline pilots and civilian ship crews, meanwhile do the traditional military salutes if they are in uniform and on duty; off-duty personnel do the hand-to-heart salutes. During the Martial Law years from 1972 to 1981 up to the 1986 EDSA Revolution, the "raised clenched fist" salute was done during the singing and playing of the National Anthem by some political and protest groups, more evidently opposition parties and activists.

People whose faith or religious beliefs prohibit them from singing the anthem or reciting the patriotic pledge such as Jehovah's Witnesses are exempted from doing the salutes but are still required to show full respect when the anthem is being sung or played on record by standing at attention and not engaging in disruptive activities.

Scouting
Boy Scouts and Girl Scouts meanwhile have their own form of salutes.

Thailand
Thailand has a "Flag Code" that determines how the flag should be displayed and respected. Section 7 of the "Flag Code" mandates that, upon seeing the raising or lowering of the flag at 08:00 and 18:00, general civilians should stand at attention and face the flag. In case only the National Anthem is heard, or one is in a vehicle, one should come to a complete stop until the National Anthem ends. Uniformed government employees are further governed by their own regulations. For example, specific military manuals define whether to salute the Flag while in formation for the enlisted and the officers. The laws themselves do not specify punishment for not respecting or saluting the flag, only for using illegal flags. There was a case where a man was fined 400 baht for not stopping his vehicle for the National Anthem, but a lawyer explained (publicly) that the traffic ticket itself is illegal because stopping the vehicle for the National Anthem is not legally required, and the name and affiliation (precinct name) of the citing officer were also omitted, further invalidating the ticket.

In addition to the National Anthem, the Royal Anthem Sansoen Phra Barami is also given a similar respect. The laws regarding lèse majesté in Thailand do not contain punishment for merely ignoring (not standing up or silently ignoring it) the Royal Anthem since it is not a direct threat against the royalty. However, it is a serious criminal offense to make offensive gestures.

Roman salute 

The Roman salute is a gesture in which the arm is held out forward straight, with palm down and fingers extended straight and touching. Sometimes the arm is raised upward at an angle, sometimes it is held out parallel to the ground. A well known symbol of Fascism, it is commonly perceived to be based on a classical Roman custom.p. 2 but no known Roman work of art displays this salute, and no known Roman text describes it.

Beginning with Jacques-Louis David's painting The Oath of the Horatii (1784), an association of the gesture with Roman republican and imperial culture emerged through 18th-century French art. The association with ancient Roman traditions was further developed in France during the Napoleonic era and again in popular culture through late 19th- and early 20th-century plays and films. These include the epic Cabiria (1914), whose screenplay was attributed to Italian nationalist Gabriele d'Annunzio. In a case of life imitating art, d'Annunzio appropriated the salute as a neo-imperial ritual when he led the occupation of Fiume in 1919. It was soon adopted by the Italian Fascist party, whose use of the salute inspired the Nazi party salute. However, the armed forces (Wehrmacht) of the Third Reich used a German form of the military salute until, in the wake of the July 20 plot on Hitler's life in 1944, the Nazi salute or Hitlergruss was imposed on them.

The Bellamy salute was a similar gesture and was the civilian salute of the United States from 1892 to 1942.

In Germany showing the Roman salute is today prohibited by law. Those rendering similar salutes, for example raising the left instead of the right hand, or raising only three fingers, are liable to prosecution. The punishment derives from § 86a of the German Criminal Code and can be up to three years imprisonment or a fine (in minor cases).

Airline industry 
According to SOPs (standard operating procedures) of most airlines, the ground crew that handles departure of an aircraft from a gate (such handling normally includes: disconnecting of required for engine start pneumatic generators or aircraft power and ventilation utilities, aircraft push-back, icing inspection, etc.) are required to salute the captain before the aircraft is released for taxi. The captain normally returns the salute. Since a large percentage of airline pilots are ex-military pilots, this practice was transferred to the airline industry from the military. Exactly the same ground ceremony is appropriate to most military aircraft operations, including Air Force, Navy and Army.

One-finger salute
In Islam raising the index finger signifies the Tawhīd (تَوْحِيد), which denotes the indivisible oneness of God. It is used to express the unity of God ("There is no god but God").

In Arabic, the index or fore finger is called musabbiḥa (مُسَبِّحة), mostly used with the definite article: al-musabbiḥa (الْمُسَبِّحة). Sometimes also as-sabbāḥa (السَّبّاحة) is used. The Arabic verb سَبَّحَ (sabbaḥa), which has the same root as the Arabic word for index finger, means to praise or glorify God by saying: "Subḥāna Allāh" (سُبْحانَ الله).

Clenched fist salute 
The raised clenched fist, symbolizing unity in struggle, was popularized in the 19th century by the socialist, communist and anarchist movements, and is still used today by some people.

In the United States, the raised fist was associated with the Black Power movement, symbolized in the 1968 Olympics Black Power salute; a clenched-fist salute is also proper in many African nations, including South Africa. However, the two salutes are somewhat different: in the Black Power salute, the arm is held straight, while in the salute of leftist movements the arm is bent slightly at the elbow.

Greetings 

Many different gestures are used throughout the world as simple greetings. In Western cultures the handshake is very common, though it has numerous subtle variations in the strength of grip, the vigour of the shake, the dominant position of one hand over the other, and whether or not the left hand is used.

Historically, when men normally wore hats out of doors, male greetings to people they knew, and sometimes those they did not, involved touching, raising slightly ("tipping"), or removing their hat in a variety of gestures, see hat tip. This basic gesture remained normal in very many situations from the Middle Ages until men typically ceased wearing hats in the mid-20th century. Hat-raising began with an element of recognition of superiority, where only the socially inferior party might perform it, but gradually lost this element; King Louis XIV of France made a point of at least touching his hat to all women he encountered. However the gesture was never used by women, for whom their head-covering included considerations of modesty. When a man was not wearing a hat he might touch his hair to the side of the front of his head to replicate a hat tipping gesture. This was typically performed by lower-class men to social superiors, such as peasants to the land-owner, and is known as "tugging the forelock", which still sometimes occurs as a metaphor for submissive behaviour.

In Europe, the formal style of upper-class greeting used by a man to a woman in the Early Modern Period was to hold the woman's presented hand (usually the right) with his right hand and kiss it while bowing, see hand-kissing and kissing hands. This style has not been widespread for a century or more. In cases of a low degree of intimacy, the hand is held but not kissed. The ultra-formal style, with the man's right knee on the floor, is now only used in marriage proposals, as a romantic gesture.

The Arabic term salaam (literally "peace", from the spoken greeting that accompanies the gesture), refers to the practice of placing the right palm on the heart, before and after a handshake.

A Chinese greeting, Bao Quan Li (抱拳礼 or "fist wrapping rite"), features the right fist placed in the palm of the left hand and both shaken back and forth two or three times; it may be accompanied by a head nod or bow. The gesture may be used on meeting and parting, and when offering thanks or apologies.

In India, it is common to see the Namaste greeting (or "Sat Sri Akal" for Sikhs) where the palms of the hands are pressed together and held near the heart with the head gently bowed.

Adab, meaning respect and politeness, is a hand gesture used as a Muslim greeting of south Asian Muslims, especially of Urdu-speaking communities of Uttar Pradesh, Hyderabadi Muslims, Bengali Muslims and Muhajir people of Pakistan. The gesture involves raising the right hand towards the face with palm inwards such that it is in front of the eyes and the finger tips are almost touching the forehead, as the upper torso is bent forward. It is typical for the person to say "adab arz hai", or just "adab". It is often answered with the same or the word "Tasleem" is said as an answer or sometimes it is answered with a facial gesture of acceptance.

In Indonesia, a nation with a huge variety of cultures and religions, many greetings are expressed, from the formalized greeting of the highly stratified and hierarchical Javanese to the more egalitarian and practical greetings of the outer islands. Javanese, Batak and other ethnicities currently or formerly involved in the armed forces will salute a government-employed superior, and follow with a deep bow from the waist or short nod of the head and a passing, loose handshake. Hand position is highly important; the superior's hand must be higher than the inferior's. Muslim men will clasp both hands, palms together at the chest and utter the correct Islamic slametan (greeting) phrase, which may be followed by cheek-to-cheek contact, a quick hug or loose handshake. Pious Muslim women rotate their hands from a vertical to perpendicular prayer-like position to barely touch the finger tips of the male greeter and may opt out of the cheek-to-cheek contact. If the male is an Abdi Dalem royal servant, courtier or particularly "peko-peko" (taken directly from Japanese to mean obsequious) or even a highly formal individual, he will retreat backwards with head downcast, the left arm crossed against the chest and the right arm hanging down, never showing his side or back to his superior. His head must always be lower than that of his superior. Younger Muslim males and females will clasp their elder's or superior's outstretched hand to the forehead as a sign of respect and obeisance. If a manual worker or a person with obviously dirty hands salutes or greets an elder or superior, he will show deference to his superior and avoid contact by bowing, touching the right forehead in a very quick salute or a distant "slamet" gesture.

The traditional Javanese Sungkem involves clasping the palms of both hands together, aligning the thumbs with the nose, turning the head downwards and bowing deeply, bending from the knees. In a royal presence, the one performing sungkem would kneel at the base of the throne.

A gesture called a wai is used in Thailand, where the hands are placed together palm to palm, approximately at nose level, while bowing. The wai is similar in form to the gesture referred to by the Japanese term gassho by Buddhists. In Thailand, the men and women would usually press two palms together and bow a little while saying "Sawadee ka" (female speaker) or "Sawadee krap" (male speaker).

Some cultures use hugs and kisses (regardless of the sex of the greeters), but those gestures show an existing degree of intimacy and are not used between total strangers. All of these gestures are being supplemented or completely displaced by the handshake in areas with large amounts of business contact with the West.

These bows indicate respect and acknowledgment of social rank, but do not necessarily imply obeisance.

Obeisances 

An obeisance is a gesture not only of respect but also of submission. Such gestures are rarer in cultures that do not have strong class structures; citizens of the Western World, for example, often react with hostility to the idea of bowing to an authority figure. However, even in Western societies, those retaining vestiges of once rigid social hierarchy may retain the practice on formal occasions. Two examples in England are royal court protocol and the start and end of sittings of courts of justice. The distinction between a formally polite greeting and an obeisance is often hard to make; for example, proskynesis (from the words πρός pros (towards) and κυνέω kyneo (to kiss)) is described by the Greek researcher Herodotus of Halicarnassus, who lived in the 5th century BC in his Histories 1.134:

When they meet each other in the streets, you may know if the persons meeting are of equal rank by the following token: if they are, instead of speaking, they kiss each other on the lips. In the case where one is a little inferior to the other, the kiss is given on the cheek; where the difference of rank is great, the inferior prostrates himself upon the ground.

After his conquest of Persia, Alexander the Great introduced Persian etiquette into his own court, including the practice of proskynesis. Visitors, depending on their ranks, would have to prostrate themselves, bow to, kneel in front of, or kiss the king. His Greek countrymen objected to this practice, as they considered these rituals only suitable to the gods.

In countries with recognized social classes, bowing to nobility and royalty is customary. Standing bows of obeisance all involve bending forward from the waist with the eyes downcast, though variations in the placement of the arms and feet are seen. In western European cultures, women do not bow, they "curtsey" (a contraction of courtesy that became its own word), a movement in which one foot is moved back and the entire body lowered to a crouch while the head is bowed.

The European formal greeting used from men to women can be transformed into an obeisance gesture by holding the suzerain's hand with both hands. This kind of respect is due to kings, princes, sovereigns (in their kingdoms), archbishops (in their metropolitan province) or the Pope (everywhere). In ultra-formal ceremonies (a coronation, oath of allegiance or episcopal inauguration) the right knee shall touch the ground.

In South Asia traditions, obeisance also involves prostrating oneself before a king.

Many religious believers kneel in prayer, and some (Roman Catholics, and Anglicans) genuflect, bending one knee to touch the ground, at various points during religious services; the Orthodox Christian equivalent is a deep bow from the waist, and as an especially solemn obeisance the Orthodox make prostrations, bending down on both knees and touching the forehead to the floor. Roman Catholics also employ prostrations on Good Friday and at ordinations. During Islamic prayer, a kneeling bow called sajdah is used, with forehead, nose, hands, knees, and toes all touching the ground. Jews bow from the waist many times during prayer. Four times during the Yom Kippur service, and once on each day of Rosh Hashanah, many Jews will kneel and then prostrate. With the Salvation Army, when becoming a soldier, at a christening or other official event, underneath the flag, a salute is often used. This involves holding the hand, palm forwards, with all the fingers held in a clenched fist position. The index finger is left raised pointing towards God, and the hand is often held at chest height, in a similar position to that of Girl Guides.

Marching bands and Drum and Bugle Corps 
Hand salutes similar to those used in the military are rendered by the Drum Major of a marching band or drum corps just prior to beginning their performance (after the show announcer asks if the group is ready), following completion of the performance and at other appropriate times. In all cases the salute is rendered to the audience.

The classic "corps style" salute is often known as the "punch" type, where the saluting party will first punch their right arm straight forward from their body, arm parallel to the ground, hand in a fist, followed by the more traditional salute position with the right hand, left arm akimbo. Dropping the salute typically entails snapping the saluting hand to the side and clenching the fist, then dropping both arms to the sides.

In the US, a Drum Major carrying a large baton or mace will often salute by bringing the right hand, holding the mace with the head upward, to the left shoulder.

There are occasional, more flamboyant variations, such as the windmill action of the saluting arm given by the Madison Scouts drum major, or the running of the saluting hand around the brim of the hat worn by the Cavaliers drum major.

United Kingdom and the Commonwealth of Nations
In the United Kingdom and the Commonwealth, civilians are not expected to salute. In the United Kingdom, certain civilians, such as officers of HM Revenue and Customs, salute the quarterdeck of Royal Navy vessels on boarding.

In the past most gentlemen in Britain wore hats, and it is customary to tip the hat to a lady in salutation.

United States
In the United States, civilians may salute the national flag by placing their right hand over their heart or by standing at attention during the playing of the national anthem or while reciting the U.S. Pledge of Allegiance, or when the flag is passing by, as in a parade. Men and boys remove their hats and other headgear during the salute; religious headdress (and military headdress worn by veterans in uniform, who are otherwise civilians) are exempt. The nature of the headgear determines whether it is held in the left or right hand, tucked under the left arm, etc. However, if it is held in the right hand, the headgear is not held over the heart but the hand is placed in the same position it would be if it were not holding anything.

The Defense Authorization Act of 2009, signed by President Bush, contained a provision that gave veterans and active-duty service members not in uniform the right to salute during the playing of the national anthem. Previous legislation authorized saluting when not in uniform during the raising, lowering and passing of the flag. However, because a salute is a form of communication protected by the Free Speech clause of the First Amendment, legislative authorization is not technically required for any civilian—veteran or non-veteran—to salute the U.S. flag. Whatever the legal status, to salute wrongly is disapproved by veterans' organizations. Civilians in some other countries, like Italy, South Africa, Afghanistan, Bosnia and Herzegovina, South Korea, Croatia, Poland, Kazakhstan, and Nigeria also render the same civilian salute as their U.S. counterparts when hearing their respective national anthems.

Military salutes in popular culture 

Many artefacts of popular culture have created military salutes for fictional purposes, more often than not with a cynical or sarcastic purpose.

In his 1953 comic book album Le dictateur et le champignon, which is part of the Spirou et Fantasio series, Belgian artist Franquin creates a silly salute, used in a fictional Latin American country named Palombia. When saluting, subordinates of General Zantas must raise their hands over their heads, with the palm facing forward, then point to the top of their heads with their thumbs. Franquin repeats this idea in his 1957 comic book album Z comme Zorglub, another episode of the Spirou et Fantasio series. Here, almighty science wizard Zorglub's conscripted soldiers salute their leader by pointing to their heads with their index fingers to cynically underline how much of a genius they consider him to be.

In the Marvel Comics universe, members of the organisation Hydra salute in a similar way to a Nazi salute, but instead raise both hands with fists clenched. This is also accompanied by chanting "Hail Hydra".

In the 1987 parodic science fiction film Spaceballs, directed by Mel Brooks, all subordinates of supreme leader President Skroob salute him by first bending their forearms over their opposed hands, as though they are about to give him the arm of honor salute, but at the last moment, use their raised hands to wave him goodbye, rather than showing him the middle finger.

In the BBC TV science fiction comedy Red Dwarf, Arnold J. Rimmer continually performs an elaborate special salute that he has invented for the Space Corps, in spite of the fact that he is not a member of the Corps. It consists of extending the hand out in front of the body, palm down and rotating it about the wrist five times (to represent the five rings of the Space Corps), followed by bringing the hand close to the head with the palm facing out.

In the sci-fi dystopia novels and film franchise The Hunger Games, citizens of District 12 salute tributes by pressing the 3 middle fingers of their left hand to their lips, then raising them towards to person being saluted.

In the Cartoon Network animated TV show Steven Universe, gems salute their superiors by crossing their arms infront of them and bending their palms backwards until the tips of their fingers touch, forming a diamond shape with their hands.

In the Japanese manga and anime Attack on Titan, members of the Paradis armed forces, particularly the Survey Corps, conduct a salute where a clenched fist is held over the heart, wrist up, while the other hand is clenched and held behind the back, parallel to the waist.

See also

 Feu de joie
 Noon-day Gun
 Present arms (command)
 Quenelle (gesture)
 Three-finger salute (scouts)
 Water salute
 Wave (gesture)

References

External links

 Why Palm Out? History of the British Army Hand Salute Extensively researched article discovers the true origins to the British hand salute.  

 Leonard Wong, Douglas C. Lovelace, Jr.: Knowing when to Salute, Strategic Studies Institute of the US Army War College, July 2007

Military life
Hand gestures
Greetings
Gestures of respect
 
Military traditions